Mary Ruth Maxted (née Quilter; 30 November 1945 – 19 August 1979), known professionally as Mary Millington from 1974 onwards, was an English model and pornographic actress. Her appearance in the short softcore film Sex is My Business led to her meeting with magazine publisher David Sullivan, who promoted her widely as a model, and featured her in the softcore comedy Come Play With Me, which ran for a record-breaking four years at the same cinema. However, in her later years she faced depression and pressure from frequent police raids on her sex shop. After a downward spiral of drug addiction, shoplifting and debt, she died at home of an overdose of medications and vodka. She was 33.

Millington has been described as one of the "two hottest British sex film stars of the seventies", the other being Fiona Richmond.

Early life
Mary Ruth Quilter was born out of wedlock on 30 November 1945, brought up by her single mother, Joan Quilter (19 February 1914 – 17 May 1976), initially in Willesden and later in Mid Holmwood near Dorking. Growing up without her father, John William G. Klein (1899–1973), Mary was bullied at school owing to being illegitimate, and suffered from low self-esteem throughout her childhood and teenage years. She left school at age 15 in 1961, and at age 18 in 1964 she married Robert Maxted, and lived in Dorking. She had to nurse her terminally ill mother for more than ten years, and began her pornography career to pay for her mother's care. She had wanted to be a fashion model, but at 4 feet 11 inches she was not tall enough. Instead she became a glamour model in the late 1960s.

Career
Soon after becoming a glamour model, she met the glamour photographer and pornographer John Jesnor Lindsay, who offered to photograph her for softcore magazines. She became one of his most popular models and began appearing in 8mm hardcore pornographic film loops which sold well in Europe. One of her first films was Miss Bohrloch in 1970. Miss Bohrloch won the Golden Phallus Award at the Wet Dream Festival held in November 1970 in Amsterdam. Maxted starred in around twenty short hardcore films for John Lindsay, although only five (Miss Bohrloch, Oral Connection, Betrayed, Oh Nurse and Special Assignment) have so far resurfaced. She then returned to modelling for British pornographic magazines such as Knave and Men Only. She also appeared in softcore short films by Russell Gay (Response, 1974), Mountain Films (Love Games, Wild Lovers) and Harrison Marks (Sex is My Business, c.1974).

Sex is My Business was shot late on a Saturday night at a sex shop on London's Coventry Street. The storyline concerns a powerful aphrodisiac being dropped by a customer, the potency of which renders the shop's staff and customers sex crazy. Maxted, dressed in a short see-through dress, is the film's main focus of attention, playing a member of staff who drags a customer into the back room for some multi-position sex, thoughtfully turning on the shop's CCTV camera so others can watch. Sex is My Business was considered something of a lost film until a Super 8 print was located and privately transferred to DVD in 2008. The film subsequently made its internet debut on 26 July 2008 at the (now defunct) site ZDD Visual Explosion. In 2010 Sex is My Business was included as a special feature on the DVD re-release of Come Play With Me.

In February 1974, Maureen O’Malley, her co-star in Sex is My Business introduced her to adult magazine publisher David Sullivan. Although she was still married, the pair became lovers. Quilter had used many different stage names and aliases during her pornography career up to 1974, until Sullivan rebranded her as Mary Millington. In her first appearance in Sullivan's Whitehouse magazine, he claimed that she was the bisexual nymphomaniac sister of the magazine's editor Doreen Millington, and so gave Mary her new stage name. She became well-known thanks to her appearances in Sullivan's pornographic magazines such as Whitehouse and Private. She soon became the most popular model in any of Sullivan's magazines. In November 1977, magistrates acquitted her and Sullivan following prosecution under the Obscene Publications Acts.

She had a small part in Sullivan's 1977 softcore sex comedy Come Play with Me, alongside Alfie Bass and Irene Handl. Although critically panned, the film was highly successful, running continuously for four years at one London cinema. It then became one of the first British films to sell in large numbers on the new VHS format. This was followed by a larger role in The Playbirds (1978), in which she was cast as a policewoman working undercover as a nude model. Although her lack of acting training was evident, The Playbirds was a commercial success. Like Come Play with Me it was extensively trailed in Sullivan's magazines. She made many public appearances at this time, promoting her films in regional cinemas, opening shops and restaurants, and raising money for the People's Dispensary for Sick Animals. At the height of her fame she was also working behind the counter in Sullivan's sex shops, mainly in the Whitehouse shop in Norbury. She continued working as a call girl, which she had done since her early modelling days. She then made a cameo appearance in Confessions from the David Galaxy Affair (1979), which was a flop, and played the title role in Queen of the Blues (1979). She appeared in other sex movies such as Eskimo Nell (1975), Intimate Games (1976) and Derek Ford's What's Up Superdoc! (1978).

In April 1978, Millington and fellow Come Play With Me actress Suzy Mandel took part in a publicity stunt for the anniversary of the opening of the film at the Moulin Cinema, posing in lingerie on the cinema's marquee. In May 1978 Millington was photographed topless outside 10 Downing Street. She was posing for an innocuous picture with a policeman when she decided to unzip her top and expose her breasts for the photograph. This surprised the people present, including Suzy Mandel, Whitehouse photographer George Richardson (who took the picture), and the policeman (who tried to confiscate the film). According to Simon Sheridan's biography of Millington, "For this stunt Mary was conditionally discharged and bound over to keep the peace".

The filming of Millington's last film appearance took place in early to mid-1978. She played Mary in the Sex Pistols film The Great Rock 'n' Roll Swindle, directed by Julien Temple, which was released theatrically in March 1980. However, neither she nor her punk rock co-star Sid Vicious lived to see the completion of the movie. Liz Fraser, one of her co-stars in the film, remembered: "I was next to this girl called Mary Millington, and she and I had a great chat together… and then we went into the pub for a lunch, during the filming of that, and someone said 'she’s a porn star', and I said 'I don’t understand what do you mean' and he said 'porn, p-o-r-n' and he said 'she’s naked and she does everything in all these films', but she was lovely and so I met my first porn star".

In 1978 she was approached to appear in a hardcore porn film called Love is Beautiful, to have been directed by Gerard Damiano. However, despite Millington and Damiano being pictured together at that year's Cannes Film Festival, the movie (meant to have been produced by David Grant's Oppidan Films) never materialized. Potential co-stars may have included Harry Reems, Gloria Brittain and Lisa Taylor. That same year she turned 33, and found herself being replaced by younger models in Sullivan's magazines.

Last years and death
Millington had suffered from neurosis and depression, which was exacerbated by her cocaine habit. Her mother's death at age 62 on 17 May 1976, after over 10 years of battling cancer, also affected her deeply, and her behaviour became unpredictable, which led to her breaking up with Sullivan. In March 1978 she ceased to work in Sullivan's Whitehouse sex shop in Norbury and opened her own in Tooting called Mary Millington's International Sex Centre. She began to spend more time working in her own sex shop, selling illegal material. The shop was raided by the police on numerous occasions, and she claimed the police threatened her and forced her to pay protection money. In the past she had publicly criticised police raids on sex shops and published the addresses and telephone numbers of Scotland Yard, the Director of Public Prosecutions and Members of Parliament in her magazines. Her life began a downward spiral into drug use and depression following the raids on her shop. A few months prior to her death, she had received a large tax bill which she was unable to pay. Her kleptomania became more pronounced in the last year of her life, with arrests for shoplifting in June 1979, and again for stealing a necklace the day before her death.

Millington died by suicide at age 33, by an overdose of tricyclic antidepressant anafranil, paracetamol and alcohol at her home in Walton-on-the-Hill, Surrey. Her husband found her dead in her bed on 19 August 1979. She left four suicide notes which were found near her body. In one of them she had written, "The police have framed me yet again. They frighten me so much. I can't face the thought of prison... The Nazi tax man has finished me as well." In another note, to her solicitor Michael Kaye (partly published in Private magazine no 59), Millington wrote "the police have killed me with their threats…the police have made my life a misery with frame ups. The tax man has hounded me so much- I will be made bankrupt, he mustn't get anything of his £200,000 demands. He is a religious maniac." In another note, to David Sullivan, she wrote: "please print in your magazines how much I want porn to be legalised, but the police have beaten me".

Millington was a member of the National Campaign for the Reform of the Obscene Publications Acts (NCROPA) and encouraged her readers to demand the abolition of the Acts. After her death, NCROPA founder David Webb wrote "Mary was a dear, kind person and we much admired her courage in standing up to the bigotry and repression which still so pervades the establishment of this country. She obviously had tremendous pressures put on her as a result and there is no doubt in my mind that these must have contributed to this tragedy."

She was buried at St Mary Magdalene Church, in South Holmwood, Surrey marked by a grey granite tombstone which bears her married name. She is buried in the same grave as her mother, Joan Quilter, who died in 1976.

Legacy
Millington has been described as one of the "two hottest British sex film stars of the seventies", the other being Fiona Richmond. David Sullivan described her as "the only really uninhibited, natural sex symbol that Britain ever produced and who believed in what she did". Between 1975 and 1982 there was always at least one of Millington's films playing in London's West End.

A posthumous film about her life was released in 1980, entitled Mary Millington's True Blue Confessions. In 1996, Channel Four screened a tribute to her entitled Sex and Fame: The Mary Millington Story, featuring an interview with David Sullivan.

Twenty years after her death, the author and film historian Simon Sheridan put Millington's life into context in the biography Come Play with Me: The Life and Films of Mary Millington. Further information about her career can be found in Sheridan's follow-up book Keeping the British End Up: Four Decades of Saucy Cinema, the fourth edition of which was published in April 2011.

In 2004 Millington's prominence was recognized by her inclusion in the Oxford Dictionary of National Biography, edited by Colin Matthew and Brian Harrison. Her entry was written by Richard Davenport-Hines.

In 2008 an exhibition of the work of the late glamour photographer Fred Grierson was held in London, which included several little-seen pictures of Millington taken by Grierson at June Palmer's Strobe Studios in the early 1970s.

In late 2009, an 8 mm copy of one of her early John Lindsay short films Special Assignment resurfaced.  Unseen since the early 1970s, it was subsequently transferred to DVD. Two years later in 2011, Wild Lovers, another 8 mm film starring Millington, was also traced and transferred from 8 mm to DVD.

In 2014, four spoken word erotic stories recorded by Millington in 1978–9 were released as a vinyl LP. 

A nightclub in Liverpool is named after her. She is commemorated in a blue plaque on the site of the former Moulin Cinema in Great Windmill Street, Soho for her appearance in Come Play with Me. The film is listed in the Guinness Book of World Records as running there continuously for 201 weeks, from April 1977 to March 1981, making it the longest-running British film. The validity of this record and the blue plaque have been called into question by film historian Allen Eyles who says that Come Play with Me ran for 165 weeks and that Britain's longest running film was South Pacific which ran for four years and twenty-two weeks. Nevertheless, Come Play With Me still stands as one of the longest-running films in British movie history.

Millington self-identified as bisexual, and said that she preferred lesbian sex.

Respectable – The Mary Millington Story (2015)
A feature-length documentary chronicling Millington's life, entitled Respectable – The Mary Millington Story, was partly shot and produced at Pinewood Studios in 2015.

Written, directed and produced by Mary Millington's biographer Simon Sheridan, the film mixes archive footage, previously unseen photographs and interviews with Millington's family, friends and co-stars, including David Sullivan, Pat Astley, Dudley Sutton, Linzi Drew and Flanagan.

The film received its world premiere at London's Regent Street Cinema in April 2016. A DVD of the film was released in the UK on 2 May 2016.

Filmography
 Miss Bohrloch (short, 1970)
 Oh, Nurse! (short, 1971)
 Special Assignment (short 1971)
 Oral Connection (short, 1971)
 Betrayed (short, early 1970s)
 Love Games (short, early 1970s)
 Wild Lovers (short, early 1970s)
 Party Pieces (short, early 1970s)
 Secrets of a Door-to-Door Salesman (1973)
 Response (aka Go Down, My Lovely) (short, 1974)
 Sex is My Business (aka Sex Shop) (short, 1974)
 Eskimo Nell (1974)
 Erotic Inferno (1975)
 Private Pleasures (Shot in Sweden, 1975)
 Keep It Up Downstairs (1976)
 I'm Not Feeling Myself Tonight (1976)
 Intimate Games (1976)
 Come Play with Me (1977)
 The Playbirds (1978)
 What's Up Superdoc! (1978)
 Confessions from the David Galaxy Affair (1979)
 Queen of the Blues (1979)
 The Great Rock 'n' Roll Swindle (posthumous, 1980)
 Mary Millington's True Blue Confessions (posthumous, 1980)
 Mary Millington's World Striptease Extravaganza (posthumous, 1981)
 Sex and Fame: The Mary Millington Story (TV documentary, 1996)
 Respectable - The Mary Millington Story (cinema documentary, 2015)

Selected magazine appearances
 Frivol No.37 (German magazine) "The Summit of Bliss" (Miss Bohrloch stills)
 Frivol No.40 (German magazine) Miss Bohrloch stills
 Frivol No.41 (German magazine) Miss Bohrloch stills
 Vi Menn No. 233 (Norwegian magazine) as "Sally Stephens" Britiske Kvinner stillbilder 1970
 Vi Menn No. 266 (Norwegian magazine) as "Rebecca Stephens" Britiske Kvinner stillbilder 1973
 Vi Menn No. 268 (Norwegian magazine) as "Rebecca Stephens" Britiske Kvinner stillbilder 1973
 Around the World in 80 Lays (volumes 1 & 2) photo-novel by Beryl Grant 1974 (cover)
 Vibrations Vol 5 No 12 as 'Sally Stevens' and 'Jean' in photo-story 'Erotic Charades'
 Vibrations Vol 8 No 8 as 'Sally Stephens'
 Vibrations Vol 9 No 2 as 'Sally Stevens'
 Sexpert Vol.1 No.6 "Lonely Hearts Club"
 Sex Games Vol.1 No.2 (Goldstar Publications, cover only)
 Sexpert Vol.2 No.8 1974
 Knave Vol.6 No.3 1974 (Cover and 8 pages inside inc centerfold)
 Fiesta Vol.8 No.6 1974
 Caprice Plus No.4 1974
 New Direction Vol.5 No.8 197?
 Supermag No.4 197?
 Late Night Extra 1974 (As "Nancy Astley")
 Titbits No.4613, 1– 7 August 1974, ("Eskimo Nell")
 Fiesta Vol 8 no 5 1974 inside photograph of Mary on the London Underground
 Janus Vol.4 No.7 circa 1975 (cover picture)
 Janus Vol.4 No.8 circa 1975 (cover picture)
 Spick No.261 August 1975 (as "Mary Maxted")
 Beautiful Britons No.238 September 1975
 Rustler Vol.1, No.5, 1976 (Small cover photo, 5-page layout with 11 photographs)
 Club International Vol.5, No.1, January 1976 (5 pages as "Mia" with Pat Astley)
 Beautiful Britons No.247 June 1976
 Playbirds Vol.1, No.1 1975
 Playbirds Vol.1, No.2 1975 (cover and 15 pages inc colour photographs)
 Playbirds Vol.1, No.3 1975
 Playbirds Vol.1, No.4 1975
 Playbirds Vol.1, No.6 1975
 Playbirds Vol.1, No.8 1975 (Millington at the Frankfurt trade fair)
 Playbirds Vol.1, No.16 1976 (cover and inside)
 Playbirds Vol.1, No 21 1976 (Cover only)
 Playbirds Vol.1, No 24 1976 (inside)
 Continental Film Review Vol.25, No.6, 1978 (The Playbirds)
 Continental Film Review Vol.25, No.7, 1978 (The Playbirds)
 Cover Girl Vol.1, No.3 1978
 Cover Girl Vol.1, No.6 1978
 Private No.28 1977
 Park Lane No.15 197?
 Weekend Sex No.17 197?
 Whitehouse No.10 197?
 Whitehouse No.15 197? (Cover 5 pages article inside)
 Whitehouse No.16 197? (10 pages inc colour photographs and centre spread)
 Whitehouse No.40 197? (colour trade ad for Playbirds film and four-page synopsis)
 Whitehouse No.47 197? (colour trade ad for The David Galaxy Affair plus four-page article on film)
 Weekend Sex No.31 197?
 Park Lane No.10 197? (5 pages article plus two pages colour photographs)
 Park Lane No.11 197? (8 pages article)
 Park Lane No.23 197?
 Ladybirds No.1 1976
 New Action MS no. 28 (Millington meets Rosemary England photo shoot)
 Playbirds erotic film guide No.1 (Millington cover, Come Play with Me feature)
 Climax No.14 1975
 Exciting Cinema No.18 circa 1979 ("Mary Millington meets Rosemarie England in the Flesh")
 International Cover Girls No.14 1979
 Revel No. 3 (Tribute to Millington)

* David Sullivan's magazines were often undated, as such the only way of dating them is by which Sullivan produced films were being promoted inside the magazines, i.e. a Sullivan magazine which promotes Come Play With Me would be from 1976/1977, ones promoting The Playbirds would be circa 1978, and ones promoting Confessions from the David Galaxy Affair from 1979.

See also

 Sue Longhurst
 Suzy Mandel
 List of British pornographic actors
 Pornography in the United Kingdom
 Outline of British pornography

References

Further reading

External links
 
 
 
 
 Simon Sheridan's website
 Come Play With Me: The Life and Films of Mary Millington – book listing at publisher's website

1945 births
1979 suicides
Drug-related suicides in England
English pornographic film actresses
Bisexual pornographic film actresses
British LGBT actors
People from Dorking
People from Kenton, London
Suicides in Surrey
20th-century British actresses
1979 deaths
20th-century English women
20th-century English LGBT people